Qeshlaq-e Luleh Darreh Hajj Meyn Bashi-ye Olya (also Romanized as Qeshlāq-e Lūleh Darreh Ḩājj Meyn Bāshī-ye ‘Olyā) is a village in Abish Ahmad Rural District, Abish Ahmad District, Kaleybar County, East Azerbaijan Province, Iran. At the 2006 census, its population was 27, in 6 families.

References 

Populated places in Kaleybar County